Dziewoński or Dziewonski is a surname. It may refer to:

Adam Dziewonski (1936–2016), Polish-American geophysicist 
Edward Dziewoński (1916–2002), Polish stage and film actor, and theatre director
Maciej Dziewoński (died 1794), Polish priest, noted for his opposition to the Kościuszko Uprising and his espionage for the Russians and beheaded on May 31, 1794 for the act

Polish-language surnames